Cleonis pigra, the sluggish weevil or large thistle weevil, is a weevil species recorded in Britain and native to Eurasia. It was introduced into North America to help control creeping thistle. This species develops in the roots of plants in the family Asteraceae.

It appears spelled different ways in the literature: Cleonis piger, Cleonus piger, Cleonus pigra, but the correct spelling under ICZN Article 31.2 is Cleonis pigra

It is identified by double V-pattern elytra and a rostrum with three sulci.

References

Further reading

 
 

Lixinae
Insects used for control of invasive plants
Biological pest control beetles
Beetles described in 1763
Taxa named by Giovanni Antonio Scopoli